Massimiliano Carletti (born 8 November 1973) is an Italian football goalkeeper who plays for A.S. Gualdo Calcio. He made three appearances in Serie C2 for Foligno Calcio.

External links

Living people
1973 births
Italian footballers
Association football goalkeepers
A.S. Gualdo Casacastalda players
A.S.D. Città di Foligno 1928 players